J.B Soedarmanto Kadarisman (May 8, 1930 – December 10, 2012) was an Indonesian diplomat who served as the country's Chief of Protocol in the early 1980s, as ambassador to Argentina from 1987 to 1988, and as ambassador to the Netherlands from 1994 to 1998.

Diplomatic career
From 1958 to 1961, Kadarisman served as the Third Secretary in Consulate General of the Republic of Indonesia in Karachi.

1962 to 1965 he was appointed as the Political Function at the  Embassy of the Republic of Indonesia, Moscow, USSR. Hence, he temporarily served as the official who handled Indonesian Student Associations at the Soviet Union by that time.

After his second post, he served as a staff at the Kepala Seksi Luar Negri Biro Kepegawaian at The Indonesia Ministry of Foreign Affairs

From 1976 to 1980 he was assigned as the  Minister Counselor at The Indonesian Embassy at Ethiopia, 
After his third placement, Kadarisman served as Director of Protocol from 1980 to 1983 back at the Ministry of Foreign Affairs.

On 1984 till 1987 Kadarisman was appointed as the Deputy Chief of Mission at the Indonesian Embassy of Indonesia to the Kingdom of Netherlands in the Hague.

On 1987, Kadarisman was appointed to be the  Ambassador Extraordinary and Plenipotentiary of Indonesia to Argentina, Paraguay, Uruguay, and Chile. Kadarisman only held office until 1988 and was reassigned back to his homeland to serve as Director-General of protocols and Consular who also served as Chief of Protocol to the Republic of Indonesia during President Suharto in the Sixth Development mCabinet until 1994.

Hence, In 1994 Kadarisman was sent back to represent Indonesia, he was appointed to be the  Extraordinary and Plenipotentiary Ambassador to the Kingdom of Netherlands in the Hague until 1998.

Personal life 
Kadarisman married Haroeri Sri Soewarni on December 26, 1958. From the results of this marriage, they were blessed with 4 children, 2 in-laws, and 6 grandchildren:
Sebastianus Sayoga Chandra Angkasa  Kadarisman 
 Niken Padmorini Nugroho
and
 Alphonsus Bayu Wicaksono Kadarisman.
 Jachinta Dwiyoga Chandra Kirana Kadarisman
 Lucia Triyoga Chandra Kartika Kadarisman
 Elizabeth Chatur Diahyoga Chandra Purnama Kadarisman
 Aryamir Husein Sulasmoro.
 Maria Joan d’Arc Kaira Ashanna Sulasmoro;
 Jachinta Andrea Ashakirana Sulasmoro;and
 Nathaniel Pasha Aryaputra Sulasmoro.

Honors 
Kadarisman's achievements did not stop there in 1993 he received the Main Mahaputera Bintang award, he was a career diplomat who received this award in addition to the minister, when he got the award he said in his speech this award was not for himself, but for all the corps of the Department of Foreign Affairs who have worked earnestly for the Republic of Indonesia.

  Bintang Mahaputera Utama - 1993

References 

1930 births
2012 deaths
Indonesian diplomats
Ambassadors of Indonesia to the Netherlands
Ambassadors of Indonesia to Argentina